The 2010 ICC World Twenty20 Qualifier was played from 9–13 February 2010 in the United Arab Emirates and a part of ICC World Twenty20 Qualifier series. The top two teams progressed to play in the 2010 ICC World Twenty20, the international championship of Twenty20 cricket.

The eight competing teams were: Afghanistan, Canada, Ireland, Kenya, the Netherlands, Scotland, UAE and the USA.

The groups were devised by virtue of seedings from the previous ICC World Twenty20 Qualifier, which was won jointly by Ireland and the Netherlands and, for the teams not participating in that event (Afghanistan, UAE and USA) on latest one-day rankings.

The tournament winners go into Group C of the ICC World Twenty20 2010 along with South Africa and India while the runners up will join West Indies and England in Group D. The tournament was won by Afghanistan who defeated Ireland by 8 wickets in the final. This was the first major tournament Afghanistan qualified for, while leading associates the Netherlands and Scotland failed to qualify this time.

Squads

Group stage

Group A

Group B

Super Four

Final

Both finalists qualified for the 2010 ICC World Twenty20 – Afghanistan for Group C and Ireland for Group D.

Statistics

References

ICC World Twenty20 Qualifier
ICC World Twenty20 Qualifier
Cricket in the United Arab Emirates
2010 in Scottish cricket
2010 ICC World Twenty20
ICC Men's T20 World Cup Qualifier
2010 in Emirati cricket